The Northville–Lake Placid Trail, also known as the NPT, is a lightly travelled foot trail that runs 138 miles (214 km) through the Adirondack Park in northern New York State.  It was laid out by the Adirondack Mountain Club in 1922 and 1923 and is  maintained by the New York State Department of Environmental Conservation. From 2014-2016 the southern section of the trail was re-routed to remove most of the road walk into the town of Northville. The southern terminus is Waterfront Park in Northville, NY and the northern terminus is Averyville Rd in Lake Placid.

South to north, it traverses:
Shaker Mountain Wild Forest
Silver Lake Wilderness Area
Jessup River Wild Forest
West Canada Lake Wilderness Area
Moose River Plains Wild Forest
Blue Ridge Wilderness Area
Blue Mountain Wild Forest
High Peaks Wilderness Area

References

External links
 Northville–Placid Trail Chapter of the ADK
 Trail Journals of Northville–Placid Trail hikers

Long-distance trails in the United States
Protected areas of Hamilton County, New York
Protected areas of Fulton County, New York
Protected areas of Essex County, New York
Protected areas of Franklin County, New York
Adirondack Park
Hiking trails in New York (state)